Marshall Goodwin Simms Hodgson (April 11, 1922 – June 10, 1968), was an Islamic studies academic and a world historian at the University of Chicago. He was chairman of the interdisciplinary Committee on Social Thought in Chicago.

Works
Though he did not publish extensively during his lifetime, he has become arguably the most influential American historian of Islam due to his three-volume The Venture of Islam: Conscience and History in a World Civilization, which The University of Chicago Press, in collaboration with Reuben Smith and other colleagues, published after his death. The work is recognized as a masterpiece that radically reconfigured the academic study of Islam. Hodgson is also recognized for his work on world history, which was rediscovered and subsequently published under the editorship of Edmund Burke III.

In The Venture of Islam, Hodgson positioned Islam as a spiritual endeavor with a profound moral vision—on par with other world religions. He also reimagined the terminology of Islamic history and religion, coining terms like Islamdom (playing off "Christendom"). Hodgson also resituated the geographical locus of Islam; he shifted attention away from an exclusive focus on Arab Islam that had characterized the Euro-American study of the religion to include the Persianate society (his coinage), which shaped Muslim thought and practice from the Middle Period onward.

Hodgson's writings were a precursor to the modern world history approach. His initial motivation in writing a world history was his desire to place Islamic history in a wider context and his dissatisfaction with the prevailing Eurocentrism and Orientalism of his day. Hodgson painted a global picture of world history, in which the "Rise of Europe" was the end-product of millennia-long evolutionary developments in Eurasian society; modernity could conceivably have originated somewhere else. Indeed, he accepted that China in the twelfth century was close to an industrial revolution, a development that was derailed, perhaps, by the Mongol onslaught in the thirteenth century:

"Occidental development had come ultimately from China, as did apparently, the idea of a civil service examination system, introduced in the eighteenth century. In such ways the Occident seems to have been the unconscious heir of the abortive industrial revolution of Sung China" Marshall G. S. Hodgson Rethinking World History: Essays on Europe, Islam and World History (Cambridge 1993), p.68.

Regarding western exceptionalism, he argued that it began with the Scientific Revolution of the seventeenth century rather than the Renaissance of the fourteenth century . His explanations for the divergence are rooted in the idea of a 'great Western Transmutation.'  This is not to be confused with the Industrial Revolution, as it includes variables more diverse than just industry.  Hodgson posited that all the societal elements (industry, banking, health care, police, etc.) of Western European nations became so advanced (or 'technicalized') and co-dependent that those societies were able to determine their own rate of progress.

The two most important influences on Hodgson's thought were the French orientalist and priest Louis Massignon and the eighteenth-century American Quaker, John Woolman. From the former he learned empathy and respect for Islam, while the latter represented a critical view of Eurocentrism and an embodiment of Hodgson's own Quaker conscience.

Islamicate

Hodgson introduced the term Islamicate to refer to characteristics of regions where Muslims, while culturally dominant, were not, properly speaking, “religious”: "'Islamicate' would refer not directly to the religion, Islam, itself, but to the social complex historically associated with Islam and the Muslims, both among Muslims themselves and even when found among non-Muslims". For example, wine poetry was Islamicate, but not Islamic according to Hodgson. This terminological distinction has not been widely adopted.

Life
Marshall Hodgson was born in Richmond, Indiana in April 11, 1922. He was a practicing Quaker, a strict vegetarian. He worked in the Civilian Public Service as a conscientious objector from 1943 to 1946. In 1951, he received his PhD from the University of Chicago, where he later became professor, receiving tenure in 1961, becoming chairman of the Committee in Social Thought in 1964 and the newly established Committee on Near Eastern Studies in the same year. He was married and had three daughters. Hodgson died in 1968 while jogging on the University of Chicago campus.

Bibliography
 The Secret Order of Assassins: The Struggle of the Early Nizârî Ismâʻîlîs against the Islamic World. 's-Gravenhage, Mouton, 1955.
 The Venture of Islam: Conscience and History in a World Civilization, Vols 1-3. Chicago: The University of Chicago Press, 1974.
 Rethinking World History: Essays on Europe, Islam and World History.  Cambridge: Cambridge University Press, 1993.

See also
World history
Islamic studies

References
Notes

External links 
 
 Guide to the Marshall G. S. Hodgson Papers 1940-1971 at the University of Chicago Special Collections Research Center
Genius Denied and Reclaimed: A 40-Year Retrospect on Marshall G.S. Hodgson’s The Venture of Islam Bruce B. Lawrence at Marginalia November 11, 2014
ISLAMICATE SOCIETY Encyclopedia of Islam and the Muslim World article by R. Kevin Jaques at Encyclopedia.com

1922 births
1968 deaths
American Quakers
American orientalists
American Islamic studies scholars
20th-century American historians
20th-century American male writers
Christian scholars of Islam
American male non-fiction writers
20th-century Quakers